Soundin' Off is an album by Jamaican-born jazz trumpeter Dizzy Reece. It features performances recorded in 1960 and released the same year on Blue Note.

Reception

The Allmusic review awarded the album 4 stars, stating: "Throughout the album, Reece digs into his bag of sonic tricks without ever doing anything that detracts from the music itself. Soundin' Off is a little bit uneven, but is never less than a solid pleasure to listen to."

Track listing
 "A Ghost of a Chance" (Bing Crosby, Ned Washington, Victor Young) - 5:06
 "Once in a While" (Michael Edwards, Bud Green) - 7:30
 "Eb Pob" (Dizzy Reece) - 7:46
 "Yesterdays" (Otto Harbach, Jerome Kern) - 7:11
 "Our Love Is Here to Stay" (George Gershwin, Ira Gershwin) - 6:21
 "Blue Streak" (Dizzy Reece) - 7:56

Personnel
Dizzy Reece - trumpet
Walter Bishop Jr. - piano
Doug Watkins - bass
Art Taylor - drums

References

Blue Note Records albums
Dizzy Reece albums
1960 albums
Albums recorded at Van Gelder Studio